Eureka Shipyard was located on the Hudson River in Newburgh, New York. This shipyard built a number of ships for the United States Navy and Liberty/Cargo ships during World War II. Commercial vessels were also built here.

References

Hudson River
Buildings and structures in Orange County, New York
Shipyards of New York (state)